The 2015 Duquesne Dukes football team represented Duquesne University in the 2015 NCAA Division I FCS football season. They were led by 11th-year head coach Jerry Schmitt and played their home games at Arthur J. Rooney Athletic Field. They were a member of the Northeast Conference. They finished the season 8–4, 5–1 in NEC play to win the NEC championship. They received the NEC's automatic bid to the FCS playoffs where they lost in the first round to William & Mary.

Schedule

Source: Schedule

References

Duquesne
Duquesne Dukes football seasons
Northeast Conference football champion seasons
Duquesne
Duquesne Dukes football